Quri (Quechua for gold, Hispanicized spelling Curi) is a mountain in the Cusco Region in Peru, about  high. It is situated in the Quispicanchi Province, Quiquijana District.
The mountain lies at the confluence of the Willkanuta River and its right tributary Uchuymayu (Quechua for "little river") in Quiquijana.

References 

Mountains of Peru
Mountains of Cusco Region